Kalwadi is a village in Junnar taluka, Pune district, of Maharashtra, India situated adjuscent to the Kukadi River and Yedgaon Dam.

GauEcoGram Agrovikas Farmer Producer Company Limited having registered office at Kalwadi

External links
 Kalwadi

Villages in Pune district